Taylor Bowlin (born January 18, 1991) is an American professional soccer player who currently plays for Pars FC Örebro in the Swedish Football Association.

Career

College and Amateur
Bowlin started his college soccer career in 2009 at UNLV before transferring to Cal State Northridge in 2010.

While at college, Bowlin also appeared for USL PDL club's Ogden Outlaws and Kansas City Brass, as well as NPSL club San Diego Flash in 2013.

Professional
Bowlin spent time with Major League Soccer club Real Salt Lake reserves and Primera B de Chile club A.C. Barnechea of Santiago, Chile before signing with USL Pro club Dayton Dutch Lions on March 24, 2014. He received an Honorable Mention for week 23 of the 2014 USL Pro season.

References

External links
Dayton Dutch Lions FC Bio
 Cal State Northridge Bio
Pars FC Örebro blog bio

1991 births
Living people
American soccer players
UNLV Rebels men's soccer players
Cal State Northridge Matadors men's soccer players
Ogden Outlaws players
Kansas City Brass players
San Diego Flash players
Dayton Dutch Lions players
Association football defenders
Soccer players from Missouri
USL League Two players
USL Championship players